Bramble Park Zoo is located in Watertown, South Dakota. Open since 1912, the zoo comprises  with approximately 500 animals representing 130 different species.

Bramble Park Zoo has been an accredited member of the Association of Zoos & Aquariums (AZA) since 1993.

History 
The zoo was opened in 1912, and is named after Frank Bramble, who donated pheasants and other birds to the town to put on display. By 1940, the zoo had outgrown its original facility, and was moved to its current location. The new exhibits for the zoo were constructed by the Works Progress Administration (WPA).

In 1972, the Lake Area Zoological Society (LAZS) was created "to provide significant assistance in the growth, development and professionalism of the Zoo." The LAZS puts out a quarterly publication called animal chatter.

In the 1990s, the zoo received accreditation from the Association of Zoos and Aquariums (AZA) (1993), hired its first full-time educator (1996), and built the Discovery Center and a new front entrance to the zoo (1997). With money from the city and an Institute of Museum and Library Services (IMLS) grant, the zoo also renovated animal-holding areas and other infrastructure, constructed additional raptor rehabilitation areas, and revitalized the primate exhibits.

Throughout the first decade of the 21st century, the zoo continued to update and expand its exhibits. It created a walk-through Australian Adventure exhibit and a short grass prairie garden.
In May 2010, the Terry Redlin Environmental Center opened, which includes a variety of aquariums, which were donated by Terry Redlin's son. It also includes educational activities, smaller animal exhibits, and two new educational classrooms. The new center is connected to the Discovery Center building at the entrance of the zoo.

Animals, exhibits, and facilities

Jaguar Junction houses both regular phase and melanistic ("black") jaguars in a large naturalistic exhibit. It includes a pond and waterfall for the animals, and glass viewing areas for visitors.

The Bird of Prey Plaza features a raptor show with rehabilitated birds of prey.

The  Discovery Center and front entrance includes educational exhibits, classrooms, offices, and a gift shop and concessions area. Plus the new Terry Redlin Environmental Center is connected to the building of the Discovery Center.

The Children's Playground next to the Discovery Center features animal themed climbing structures.

The Children's Zoo is located near the Australian Adventure. It includes an area for goats, donkeys, and domestic rabbits, of which you can pet. It also has a small play area for children and a small viewing case which includes farm related animals.

The zoo's most famous resident was the white Bengal tiger "Tika" who died in 2012. Other large cats include snow leopards and jaguars

Large mammals include red kangaroos, gray wolves, swift foxes, black bears, Bactrian camels, reindeer, American bison, and coyotes

Primates include black lemur, ring-tailed lemurs, black-and-white ruffed lemurs, golden lion tamarins, spider monkeys, white-headed capuchins, De Brazza's monkey, black-and-white colobus, and siamangs

Medium and small mammals include African hedgehogs, domestic rabbits, guinea pigs, ferret, prairie dogs, Sicilian donkeys, African pygmy goats, chinchillas, and muntjacs

Arthropods include Madagascar hissing cockroaches and Chilean rose tarantulas

Fish include Northern Atlantic seahorses, African cichlids, saddleback clownfish, yellow tang, watchman goby, blue hippo tang, pistol shrimp, rainbow trout, damselfish, lionfish, arowana, and Jack Dempseys

Amphibians include Fire-bellied toads, tiger salamanders, and leopard frogs

Reptiles include Three-toed box turtles, African pancake tortoises, American alligators, central bearded dragons, New Guinea blue-tongued skinks, boa constrictor, Burmese pythons, Ball pythons, corn snakes, Western hognose snake, California kingsnake, radiated tortoises, red-footed tortoise, false map turtle, red-eared sliders, alligator snapping turtle, and leopard geckos

Birds include African penguins, scarlet ibis, roseate spoonbills, white-fronted geese, snow geese, Canada geese, barnacle geese, trumpeter swans, black-bellied whistling ducks, white-faced whistling ducks, North American wood ducks, canvasbacks, ringed teal, North American ruddy ducks, Andean condors, red-tailed hawks, bald eagles, great horned owl, Swainson's hawk, Icelandic chickens, silver pheasants, peafowl, wild turkeys, Florida sandhill cranes, white cockatoo, yellow-naped amazon parrots, red-lored amazon parrots, blue-and-yellow macaws, sun parakeet, Jackson's hornbills, long-tailed finches, Bourke's parrot, red-crowned cranes, Taveta weavers, northern pintails, greater scaup, white-headed buffalo weavers, Temminck's tragopan, Von der Decken's hornbills, crested partridge, rock doves, Ross's turacos, and Himalayan monals

Conservation

The zoo participates in AZA Species Survival Plans (SSP), and is active in local conservation programs.

The future

Plans for future expansion include a new bear exhibit.

References

External links

Buildings and structures in Watertown, South Dakota
Zoos in South Dakota
Tourist attractions in Codington County, South Dakota